Scrivner is a surname. Notable people with the surname include:

Clayton Scrivner (born 1976), American drummer
Errett P. Scrivner (1898–1978), American politician
Lee Scrivner (born 1971), American writer and cultural theorist